John Aloysius "Buddy" Hassett (September 5, 1911 – August 23, 1997) was an American professional baseball first baseman and outfielder.  He played in Major League Baseball (MLB) for the Brooklyn Dodgers, Boston Bees / Braves, and New York Yankees.

Hassett started his professional baseball career in 1933 with the Wheeling Stogies and batted .332. In 1934 he played for the Norfolk Tars and hit .360. He also set the league record at the time for stolen bases. In 1935 he played for the Columbus Redbirds and hit .337 in the American Association and won a starting job in the majors for the next seven seasons. His major league career was cut short by World War II. In 1936 he set the record for fewest strikeouts by a rookie. He struck out just 17 times in 635 at bats. This record still stands.

After serving in the Navy from 1943 to 1945, Hassett played in the minor leagues for a few years. He also managed for the Yankees farm team, the Newark Bears in the minors until 1950. Hassett was player coach of a team of players from the US Navy Pre-flight training program in Chapel Hill, North Carolina that went to New York to play a War Chest benefit against a team of All Stars from the Yankees and Cleveland Indians, coached by Babe Ruth. The Navy team won the game and included Ted Williams, Johnny Sain, and  Johnny Pesky along with Hassett. His brother, Billy Hassett, was an All American basketball player at Georgetown University and the University of Notre Dame. Billy played professional basketball for the Chicago Gears, the Buffalo Bisons the Tri-City Blackhawks, the Minneapolis Lakers and the Baltimore Bullets (1946–1950).

A resident of Hillsdale, New Jersey, Hassett died at the age of 85 of bone cancer at Pascack Valley Hospital in Westwood, New Jersey.

References

External links

 

1911 births
1997 deaths
Major League Baseball first basemen
Baseball players from New York (state)
Binghamton Triplets managers
Brooklyn Dodgers players
Boston Bees players
Boston Braves players
New York Yankees players
Wheeling Stogies players
Norfolk Tars players
Columbus Red Birds players
Newark Bears (IL) players
Binghamton Triplets players
Manhattan Jaspers baseball players
Colorado Springs Sky Sox managers
Deaths from bone cancer
Deaths from cancer in New Jersey
People from Hillsdale, New Jersey
United States Navy personnel of World War II